Paraphlebia hyalina is a species of damselfly native to Mexico.

External links 
 ITIS

Calopterygoidea
Insects described in 1871